The yellow-chinned sunbird (Anthreptes rectirostris) is a species of bird in the family Nectariniidae.
It is found in West Africa, namely Sierra Leone to Ghana. The grey-chinned sunbird (Anthreptes tephrolaemus) was formerly grouped with this species.

References

External links
Image at ADW

Anthreptes
Birds of the Gulf of Guinea
Birds described in 1812
Taxonomy articles created by Polbot
Birds of West Africa